Hypatima venefica is a moth in the family Gelechiidae. It was described by Ponomarenko in 1991. It is found in the Russian Far East, Korea and Japan.

The wingspan is 14.5–19 mm. The forewings are ochreous, speckled with light brown scales and dark fuscous streaks near the base, the middle and beneath and beyond the cell. The hindwings are grey.

The larvae feed on Quercus mongolica.

References

Hypatima
Moths described in 1991